Mario Kordić (born 28 June 1972) is a Bosnian Croat politician serving as mayor of Mostar since 2021. He is a member of the Croatian Democratic Union (HDZ BiH).

References

1972 births
Living people
People from Mostar
Croats of Bosnia and Herzegovina
University of Zagreb alumni
Croatian Democratic Union of Bosnia and Herzegovina politicians
Politicians from Mostar
Mayors of Mostar